Thomas Creek is a stream in Shelby County in the U.S. state of Missouri. It is a tributary of the North Fork Salt River.

Thomas Creek has the name of Henson Thomas, an early settler.

See also
List of rivers of Missouri

References

Rivers of Shelby County, Missouri
Rivers of Missouri